The Knutepunkt is an annual role-playing game conference held annually in the Nordic countries since 1997. It has been a vital institution in establishing a Nordic role-playing identity, and in establishing the concept of "Nordic larp" as a unique approach. Though the conference started out strictly as a Live action role-playing (larp for short) event, it has since embraced role-playing games in a more general fashion. Today the conference still has an emphasis on larp, but programs devoted to traditional tabletop role-playing as well as newer arrivals such as freeform are common. 

A live action role-playing avant-garde movement, which pursues radical experimentation and the recognition of role-playing as a form of art, has been connected to the Knutepunkt conferences. The scope of the Knutepunkt conference has expanded rather rapidly over the last few years with participants showing up from numerous non-Scandinavian countries. Since about 2003 Knutepunkt has seen participants from the United States, Germany, France, Poland, Italy, Russia, Estonia, Belarus, Belgium, the Netherlands, Israel, Czech Republic, United Kingdom and Austria, among others.

Name
Knutepunkt is Norwegian for "meeting point" or "knot point" as it can be directly translated as, and locally the term is translated into Swedish Knutpunkt, Danish Knudepunkt and Finnish Solmukohta. The name of the convention refers to the point where two pieces of rope or string joins in a knot, and varies with the organizing country.

History  
The organising country changes each year in this order: Norway, Sweden, Denmark and Finland.
Knutepunkt 1997 Oslo, Norway
Knutpunkt 1998 Stockholm, Sweden
Knudepunkt 1999 Copenhagen, Denmark
Solmukohta 2000 Helsinki, Finland
Knutepunkt 2001 Oslo, Norway
Knutpunkt 2002 Stockholm, Sweden
Knudepunkt 2003 Copenhagen, Denmark (Feb. 2003)
Solmukohta 2004 Espoo, Finland (Feb. 2004)
Knutepunkt 2005  Oslo, Norway (Feb. 2005)
Knutpunkt 2006 Barnens Ö (Children's Island), Sweden (Apr. 2006)
Knudepunkt 2007. Helsinge, Denmark. (Feb. 2007)
Solmukohta 2008 Nurmijärvi, Finland (Apr. 2008)
Knutepunkt 2009 Haraldvangen, Norway (16-19 Apr. 2009)
Knutpunkt 2010 Katrineholm, Sweden (Apr. 2010)
Knudepunkt 2011. Helsinge, Denmark. (Feb. 2011)
Solmukohta 2012 Nurmijärvi, Finland (Apr. 2012)
Knutepunkt 2013 Haraldvangen, Norway (Apr. 2013)
Knutpunkt 2014 Halland, Sweden (3-6 Apr 2014)
Knudepunkt 2015 Knudepunkt village (Midtfyns gymnasium, Ringe fri- og efterskole, Nordagerskolen, Midtfyns fritidscenter), Denmark (12-15 Feb. 2015)
Solmukohta 2016, Finland (9-14 Mar. 2016)
Knutepunkt 2017, Oslo, Norway (23-26 Feb. 2017)
Knutpunkt 2018, Lund, Sweden (15-18 Mar. 2018)
Knudepunkt 2019, Vejen, Denmark (8-11 Feb. 2019)
Solmukohta 2020, Tampere, Finland (2–5 Apr. 2020)
Knutepunkt 2021, Oslo, Norway (7-20 Oct. 2021)

Publications 
Since 2001 the Knutepunkt conferences have been accompanied by books on larp theory,
with the exception of the 2002 conference in Stockholm.

Anette Alfsvåg, Ingrid Storrø, Erlend Eidsem Hansen (eds.): The Book. Knudepunkt 2001. no ISBN
Morten Gade, Line Thorup & Mikkel Sander (eds.): As Larp Grows Up. Knudepunkt 2003. . https://web.archive.org/web/20060718051716/http://www.laivforum.dk/kp03_book/
Markus Montola & Jaakko Stenros (eds.): Beyond Role and Play. Solmukohta 2004. . https://web.archive.org/web/20060615144314/http://www.ropecon.fi/brap/
Petter Bøckman & Ragnhild Hutchison (eds.): Dissecting Larp. Knutepunkt 2005.  (print)  (online) http://knutepunkt.laiv.org/kp05/ 
Thorbiörn Fritzon & Tobias Wrigstad (eds.) : Role, Play, Art. Knutpunkt 2006.   . http://jeepen.org/kpbook/
Jesper Donnis, Morten Gade & Line Thorup (eds.): Lifelike. Knudepunkt 2007. . https://web.archive.org/web/20070314102705/http://www.liveforum.dk/kp07book/
Jaakko Stenros & Markus Montola (eds.): Playground Worlds. Solmukohta 2008.  (print)  (pdf) https://web.archive.org/web/20091221130755/http://www.ropecon.fi/pw/
Matthijs Holter, Eirik Fatland & Even Tømte (eds.): Larp, the Universe and Everything. Knutepunkt 2009.  http://knutepunkt.laiv.org/2009/book/ 
 Larsson, Elge (ed.): Playing Reality. Knutpunkt 2010 | Interacting Arts.  (print)  (pdf) https://web.archive.org/web/20110818143459/http://interactingarts.org/pdf/Playing%20Reality%20(2010).pdf
 Thomas Duus Henriksen, Christian Bierlich, Kasper Friis Hansen & Valdemar Kølle (eds.): Think Larp - Academic Writings from KP2011. Published by Rollespilsakademiet in conjunction with the Knudepunkt 2011 conference.  https://web.archive.org/web/20120425051237/http://rollespilsakademiet.dk/kpbooks/think_larp_web.pdf
 Claus Raasted (ed.): Talk Larp - Provocative Writings from KP2011. Published by Rollespilsakademiet in conjunction with the Knudepunkt 2011 conference.  https://web.archive.org/web/20120425051302/http://rollespilsakademiet.dk/kpbooks/talk_larp_web.pdf
 Lars Andresen, Charles Bo Nielsen, Luisa Carbonelli, Jesper Heebøll-Christensen, Marie Oscilowski (eds.): Do Larp - Documentary Writings from KP2011. Published by Rollespilsakademiet in conjunction with the Knudepunkt 2011 conference.  https://web.archive.org/web/20110812230824/http://rollespilsakademiet.dk/kpbooks/do_larp_web.pdf
 Juhana Pettersson (ed.): States of Play: Nordic Larp Around the World. Published by Pohjoismaisen roolipelaamisen seura in conjunction with the Solmukohta 2012 conference.  /  (PDF) http://www.nordicrpg.fi/julkaisut/states-of-play/
 Eleanor Saitta, Marie Holm-Andersen and Jon Back (ed.): “The Foundation Stone of Nordic Larp.” Published by Knutpunkt in conjunction with the Knutpunkt 2014 conference  (Print)/  (PDF) http://nordiclarp.org/w/images/8/80/2014_The_Foundation_Stone_of_Nordic_Larp.pdf
 Jon Back (ed.): “Knutpunkt 2014: Sharpening the Cutting Edge.” Published by Knutpunkt in conjunction with the Knutpunkt 2014 conference  (Print) /  (PDF) http://nordiclarp.org/w/images/e/e8/2014_The_Cutting_Edge_of_Nordic_Larp.pdf
 Charles Bo Nielsen and Claus Raasted (ed.): “The Knudepunkt 2015 Companion Book.” Published by Rollespilsakademiet, Copenhagen, Denmark in conjunction with the Knudepunkt 2015 conference  http://nordiclarp.org/w/images/2/27/Kp2015companionbook.pdf
 Charles Bo Nielsen and Claus Raasted (ed.): “The Nordic Larp Yearbook 2014.” Published by Rollespilsakademiet, Copenhagen, Denmark in conjunction with the Knudepunkt 2015 conference  http://nordiclarp.org/w/images/6/6d/Nordiclarpyearbook2014.pdf

Video documentation 
In 2011 the Knutepunkt conference was documented in a number of videos now published on the Knudepunkt 2011 Vimeo Channel.

External links 
Knutepunkt at the Nordic Larp Wiki

Gaming conventions
Live-action role-playing games